Michael Lawrence Stoolmiller is an American psychologist and research associate at the University of Oregon College of Education. He is also an affiliated scientist at the Oregon Social Learning Center. He is known for researching the effects of family and peer characteristics on the development of antisocial behavior in adolescents.

References

External links
Faculty page at the University of Oregon

University of Oregon faculty
University of Oregon alumni
Living people
21st-century American psychologists
American developmental psychologists
Year of birth missing (living people)